Exter is a surname. Notable people with the surname include:

Aleksandra Ekster (1882–1949), Russian-Ukrainian painter
 Joe Exter (born 1978), American ice hockey goaltender
John Exter (1910–2006), American economist
Julius Exter (1863–1939), German avant-garde painter